Brickellia chenopodina, the chenopod brickellbush, is a North American species of flowering plants in the family Asteraceae. It is native to Grant County in New Mexico.

References

External links
photo of herbarium specimen at Missouri Botanical Garden, collected in New Mexico, type specimen of Coleosanthus chenopodinus/Brickellia chenopodina

chenopodina
Flora of New Mexico
Plants described in 1913